Yoyo Chen Chi-yiu (born 27 August 1981) is a Hong Kong television actress and model contracted to TVB.

Biography

Early life
Yoyo Chen was born in Hong Kong and is of Fuzhounese ancestry. She finished secondary 7 and graduated from Po Kok Girls' Middle School at Happy Valley, Hong Kong.

Career
After signing an artiste contract with TVB, Chen made her acting debut in the 2004 drama Sunshine Heartbeat. After several minor roles, Chen began to receive bigger roles in the 2007 dramas The Brink of Law and Best Selling Secrets, earning her first nominations for the Most Improved Female Artiste and Best Supporting Actress at the 2007 TVB Anniversary Awards.

In 2020, Chen received attention and positive comments with her role in the melodrama Life After Death. She gained recognition by earning a Best Supporting Actress nomination as well as garnering her first nominations for Most Popular Female Character and Most Popular Onscreen Partnership (with Priscilla Wong and Shiga Lin) at the 2020 TVB Anniversary Awards.

In 2021, Chen participated in the reality competition shows Dub of War (好聲好戲) and Top Sales (識貨), eventually winning both competitions. With her role in the drama Plan 'B', she won the Best Supporting Actress award at the 2021 TVB Anniversary Awards, which is her first acting award in her career.

Personal life
On 11 November 2011, Yoyo Chen married TVB actor Vincent Wong. She gave birth to their daughter, Wong Ching-kiu, in April 2012.

Chen is close friends with Life After Death co-actresses Priscilla Wong and Shiga Lin. Another good friend of her is The Line Watchers co-actress Mandy Wong.

Filmography

TV dramas

Film

Awards and nominations

TVB Anniversary Awards

People's Choice Television Awards

Other awards

References

External links
 
 
 Official TVB Blog of Yoyo Chen
 Yoyo Chen on Sina Weibo

1981 births
Hong Kong film actresses
Hong Kong female models
Hong Kong television actresses
Living people
21st-century Hong Kong actresses
TVB veteran actors